Siphonogorgia godeffroyi, the cherry blossom coral or Godeffroy's Soft Coral, is a species of soft coral in the family Nidaliidae. It is native to the central Indo-Pacific region. Its range includes Indonesia, the Philippines and Papua New Guinea. This species was first described in 1874 by the Swiss biologist Albert von Kölliker.

Description

Siphonogorgia godeffroyi is an arborescent coral with red or pink bare branches. The polyps are white and star-like and are concentrated on the tips of small branches. This species feeds on plankton.

References

Nidaliidae
Animals described in 1874